Tuthill-Green House is a historic home located at 59 S. Main St. in the village of Moravia in Cayuga County, New York.  It is a -story, frame, Queen Anne–style residence.  The house was built about 1887.  Also on the property is a -story, frame carriage house, built about 1885.

It was listed on the National Register of Historic Places in 1995, when its address was 52 S. Main St.  The street has been renumbered and the house is located at what is now 59 S. Main St.</ref>

References

External links

Houses on the National Register of Historic Places in New York (state)
Queen Anne architecture in New York (state)
Houses completed in 1887
Houses in Cayuga County, New York
National Register of Historic Places in Cayuga County, New York
Moravia (village), New York